Reinu is a village in Saarde Parish, Pärnu County in southwestern Estonia.

Notable people
 

Karl Pallo (1896–1986), New Zealand importer, manufacturing engineer and businessman

References

 

Villages in Pärnu County